The NTH Ring, known by many names in Norway. The NTH-ringen, first known as Høiskoleringen, also known as Ringen, Sivilingeniørringen, NTNU/NTH-ringen or Master-ringen, is worn only by graduates of the former sivilingeniør or sivilarkitekt programmes, now graduates of the Master of Science in engineering or architecture programmes, at the Norwegian University of Science and Technology (NTNU), formerly known as NTH (Norwegian Institute of Technology).

The ring was designed by architectural student Tormod Kristoffer Hustad, who had won an international competition in 1914.

See also 
 Class ring
 Engineer's Ring
 Iron Ring
 Norwegian University of Science and Technology 
 Norwegian Institute of Technology

References

External links 
 "The NTH Ring"

Rings (jewellery)
Academia in Norway
Norwegian University of Science and Technology